Andrew Walker may refer to:

Andrew Walker (actor) (born 1979), Canadian actor and producer
Andrew Walker (barrister) (born 1968), Oxfordshire Assistant Deputy Coroner
Andrew Walker (cricketer) (born 1971), former English cricketer
Andrew Walker (footballer) (born 1986), Australian rules footballer with Carlton
Andrew Walker (murderer) ( 1954–2021), British murderer
Andrew Walker (politician) (1855–1934), New Zealand politician
Andrew Walker (rugby) (born 1973), Australian rugby league and union footballer
Andrew Barclay Walker (1824–1893), brewer and Liverpool councillor
Andrew Kevin Walker (born 1964), American screenwriter

See also
Andy Walker (disambiguation)